Hosingen is a small village and former commune in northern Luxembourg.

On January 1, 2012, the commune merged with Consthum and Hoscheid communes to form Parc Hosingen commune.

Near Hosingen there is a transmitter for FM and TV of RTL.

, the village of Hosingen, which lies in the south of the commune, had a population of 1142.

Former commune
The former commune consisted of the villages:

 Bockholtz
 Dorscheid
 Hosingen
 Neidhausen
 Obereisenbach
 Rodershausen
 Untereisenbach
 Wahlhausen
 Ackerscheid (lieu-dit)
 Dickt (lieu-dit)
 Dasbourg-Pont (lieu-dit) 
 Duerschterhaischen (lieu-dit)
 Fennbierg (lieu-dit)
 Honich (lieu-dit)
 Housenerbarrière (lieu-dit)
 Kohnenhaff (lieu-dit)
 Schmitzdell (lieu-dit)
 Veianenerstross (lieu-dit)
 Waldberg (lieu-dit)
 Wegscheid (lieu-dit)

 
Communes in Clervaux (canton)
Towns in Luxembourg